In enzymology, an indolylacetylinositol arabinosyltransferase is an enzyme that catalyzes the chemical reaction

UDP-L-arabinose + (indol-3-yl)acetyl-1D-myo-inositol  UDP + (indol-3-yl)acetyl-myo-inositol 3-L-arabinoside

Thus, the two substrates of this enzyme are UDP-L-arabinose and indol-3-ylacetyl-1D-myo-inositol, whereas its two products are UDP and (indol-3-yl)acetyl-myo-inositol 3-L-arabinoside.

This enzyme belongs to the family of glycosyltransferases, specifically the pentosyltransferases. The systematic name of this enzyme class is UDP-L-arabinose:(indol-3-yl)acetyl-myo-inositol L-arabinosyltransferase. Other names in common use include arabinosylindolylacetylinositol synthase, UDP-L-arabinose:indol-3-ylacetyl-myo-inositol, and L-arabinosyltransferase.

References

 

EC 2.4.2
Enzymes of unknown structure